A folk instrument is a musical instrument that developed among common people and usually does not have a known inventor. It can be made from wood, metal or other material. Such an instrument is played in performances of folk music.

Overview
The instruments can be percussion instruments, or different types of flutes or trumpets, or string instruments that are plucked, hammered or use a form of  bow.

Some instruments are referred to as folk instruments because they commonly appear in folk music, even though they do not meet the criteria defining a folk instrument; an example is the harmonica.

List of folk instruments

accordion
alboka
angklung
appalachian dulcimer
autoharp
bagpipe
balalaika
bandura
banjo
bağlama
binioù kozh
birimbau
bodhrán
bombard
bouzouki & Irish bouzouki
bass
brommtopp
bukkehorn
bullroarer
cajón
catá
cavaquinho
Celtic harp
chajchas
charango
çığırtma
çifteli
cimbalom
claves
concertina
concheras
cuatro
daegeum
darbuka
didgeridoo
dizi
dhol
djembe
dholak
dingulator
damphu
dotara
dranyen
drum
ektara
erhu
fiddle
fujara
gadulka
gaida
gamelan
gayageum
guanzi
gudok
guitar
guitarra Portuguesa
guitalin
gusle
gusli
haegeum
hank drum
hardingfele
harmonica
harmonium
hammered dulcimer
hurdy-gurdy
jew harp
jouhikko
jug
kazoo
kantele
kaval
khamak
klopotec
kobza
komuz
kora
kulintang
launeddas
låtfiol
lur
lute
madal
mandola
mandocello
mandolin & octave mandolin
marimbula
mbira/thumb piano
melodeon
mridangam
mountain dulcimer
musical saw
nyckelharpa
ocarina
pan flute
pipa
pogo cello
quena
phamuk
rabeca
rebab
rebec
recorder
ravanahatha
rubab
salamiyyah
sasando
shofar
sinfonia
sitar
shehnai
snare drum
smallpipes
Sarangi (Nepali)
Sarangi (Indian)
sopilka
spilåpipa
Steel Guitar
steelpan
stompbox
suona
švilpa
tabla
talking drum
tin whistle
tambura
tiple
trembita
tres
oud
ocarina
udu
uilleann pipes
ukulele
viola beiroa
viola braguesa
viola caipira
viola campaniça
viola da terra
viola toeira
violin
vuvuzela
washboard
washtub bass
willow flute
xylophone
yangqin
zampoña
zurna
zither
zhaleika

References

Ethnology
Folk music
Musical instruments